is a Japanese surname. Notable people with the surname include:

Yūichi Karasuma (烏丸 祐一, born 1982), Japanese voice actor
Setsuko Karasuma (烏丸 せつこ, born 1955), Japanese actress
Tasuku Karasuma (烏丸 匡, born 1978), Japanese manga artist

Fictional characters
, a character in the manga series Assassination Classroom
, a mysterious character in Case Closed also known as Detective Conan

Other
Karasuma Station one of the busiest stations in Kyoto 
Karasuma Line is one of two lines of the Kyoto Municipal Subway

Japanese-language surnames